Cell Death & Differentiation is a peer reviewed academic journal published by Nature Research.

Abstracted in

References

External links 
 

Nature Research academic journals
Molecular and cellular biology journals
Publications established in 2002